Alexander Emmanuel Rodolphe Agassiz (December 17, 1835March 27, 1910), son of Louis Agassiz and stepson of Elizabeth Cabot Agassiz, was an American scientist and engineer.

Biography
Agassiz was born in Neuchâtel, Switzerland and immigrated to the United States with his parents, Louis and Cecile (Braun) Agassiz, in 1846. He graduated from Harvard University in 1855, subsequently studying engineering and chemistry, and taking the degree of Bachelor of Science at the Lawrence Scientific School of the same institution in 1857; in 1859 became an assistant in the United States Coast Survey. 
Thenceforward he became a specialist in marine ichthyology. Agassiz was elected a Fellow of the American Academy of Arts and Sciences in 1862. Up until the summer of 1866, Agassiz worked as assistant curator in the museum of natural history that his father founded at Harvard.
 
E. J. Hulbert, a friend of Agassiz's brother-in-law, Quincy Adams Shaw, had discovered a rich copper lode known as the Calumet conglomerate on the Keweenaw Peninsula in Michigan. Hulbert persuaded them, along with a group of friends, to purchase a controlling interest in the mines, which later became known as the Calumet and Hecla Mining Company based in Calumet, Michigan. That summer, he took a trip to see the mines for himself and he afterwards became treasurer of the enterprise.

Over the winter of 1866 and early 1867, mining operations began to falter, due to the difficulty of extracting copper from the conglomerate. Hulbert had sold his interests in the mines and had moved on to other ventures. But Agassiz refused to give up hope for the mines. He returned to the mines in March 1867, with his wife and young son. At that time, Calumet was a remote settlement, virtually inaccessible during the winter and very far removed from civilization even during the summer. With insufficient supplies at the mines, Agassiz struggled to maintain order, while back in Boston, Shaw was saddled with debt and the collapse of their interests. Shaw obtained financial assistance from John Simpkins, the selling agent for the enterprise to continue operations.

Agassiz continued to live at Calumet, making gradual progress in stabilizing the mining operations, such that he was able to leave the mines under the control of a general manager and return to Boston in 1868 before winter closed navigation. The mines continued to prosper and in May 1871, several mines were consolidated to form the Calumet and Hecla Mining Company with Shaw as its first president. In August 1871, Shaw "retired" to the board of directors and Agassiz became president, a position he held until his death. Until the turn of the century, this company was by far the largest copper producer in the United States, many years producing over half of the total.

Agassiz was a major factor in the mine's continued success and visited the mines twice a year. He also built a railroad and dredged a channel to navigable waters. However, after a time the mines did not require his full-time, year-round, attention and he returned to his interests in natural history at Harvard. Out of his copper fortune, he gave some US$500,000 to Harvard for the museum of comparative zoology and other purposes.

Shortly after the death of his father in 1873, Agassiz acquired a small peninsula in Newport, Rhode Island, which features views of Narragansett Bay. Here he built a substantial house and a laboratory for use as his summer residence. The house was completed in 1875 and today is known as the Inn at Castle Hill.

He was a member of the scientific-expedition to South America in 1875, where he inspected the copper mines of Peru and Chile, and made extended surveys of Lake Titicaca, besides collecting invaluable Peruvian antiquities, which he gave to the Museum of Comparative Zoology (MCZ), of which he was first curator from 1874 to 1885 and then director until his death in 1910, his personal secretary Elizabeth Hodges Clark running the day-to-day management of the MCZ when his work took him abroad. He assisted Charles Wyville Thomson in the examination and classification of the collections of the 1872 Challenger Expedition, and wrote the Review of the Echini (2 vols., 1872–1874) in the reports. Between 1877 and 1880 he took part in the three dredging expeditions of the steamer Blake of the Coast Survey, and presented a full account of them in two volumes (1888). Also in 1875, he was elected as a member of the American Philosophical Society.

In 1896 Agassiz visited Fiji and Queensland and inspected the Great Barrier Reef, publishing a paper on the subject in 1898.

Of Agassiz's other writings on marine zoology, most are contained in the bulletins and memoirs of the museum of comparative zoology. However, in 1865, he published with Elizabeth Cary Agassiz, his stepmother, Seaside Studies in Natural History, a work at once exact and stimulating. They also published, in 1871, Marine Animals of Massachusetts Bay.

He received the German Order Pour le Mérite for Science and Arts in August 1902.

Agassiz served as a president of the National Academy of Sciences, which since 1913 has awarded the Alexander Agassiz Medal in his memory. He died in 1910 on board the RMS Adriatic en route to New York from Southampton.

He and his wife Anna Russell (1840-1873) were the parents of three sons – George Russell Agassiz (1861–1951), Maximilian Agassiz (1866–1943) and Rodolphe Louis Agassiz (1871–1933).

Legacy
Alexander Agassiz is commemorated in the scientific name of a species of lizard, Anolis agassizi, and a fish, Leptochilichthys agassizii.

A statue of Alexander Agassiz erected in 1923 is located in Calumet, Michigan, next to his summer home where he stayed while fulfilling his duties as the President of the Calumet and Hecla Mining Company. The Company Headquarters, Agassiz' statue, and many other buildings and landmarks from the now defunct company are today administered and maintained by the Keweenaw National Historical Park, whose headquarters overlook the statue of Agassiz.

Publications
Agassiz, Alexander (1863). "List of the echinoderms sent to different institutions in exchange for other specimens, with annotations". Bulletin of the Museum of Comparative Zoology 1 (2): 17–28.
Agassiz, Elizabeth C., and Alexander Agassiz (1865). Seaside Studies in Natural History. Boston: Ticknor and Fields. 
Agassiz, Alexander (1872–1874). "Illustrated Catalogue of the Museum of Comparative Zoology, at Harvard College. No. VII. Revision of the Echini. Parts 1–4". Memoirs of the Museum of Comparative Zoology 3: 1–762. Plates
Agassiz, Alexander (1877). "North American starfishes". Memoirs of the Museum of Comparative Zoology 5 (1): 1–136.
Agassiz, Alexander (1881). "Report on the Echinoidea dredged by H.M.S. Challenger during the years 1873–1876". Report of the Scientific Results of the Voyage of H.M.S. Challenger During the Years 1873–76. Zoology. 9: 1–321.
Agassiz, Alexander (1903). "Three cruises of the United States Coast and Geodetic Survey steamer 'Blake' in the Gulf of Mexico, in the Caribbean Sea, and along the Atlantic coast of the United States, from 1877 to 1880. Vol I". Bulletin of the Museum of Comparative Zoology 14: 1–314.
Agassiz, Alexander (1903). "Three cruises of the United States Coast and Geodetic Survey steamer 'Blake' in the Gulf of Mexico, in the Caribbean Sea, and along the Atlantic coast of the United States, from 1877 to 1880. Vol II". Bulletin of the Museum of Comparative Zoology 15: 1–220.
Agassiz, Alexander (1903). "The coral reefs of the tropical Pacific". Memoirs of the Museum of Comparative Zoology 28: 1–410. Plates I. Plates II. Plates III.
Agassiz, Alexander (1903). "The coral reefs of the Maldives". Memoirs of the Museum of Comparative Zoology 29: 1–168.  
Agassiz, Alexander (1904). "The Panamic deep sea Echini". Memoirs of the Museum of Comparative Zoology 31: 1–243. Plates.

See also
Agassiz family

References

External links

 Agassiz, George (1913). Letters and Recollections of Alexander Agassiz with a sketch of his life and work. Boston and New York: Houghton Mifflin Co.
 
 Murray, John (1911). "Alexander Agassiz: His Life and Scientific Work". Bulletin of the Museum of Comparative Zoology 54 (3). pp 139–158.
 
 
 
 Publications by and about Alexander Agassiz in the catalogue Helveticat of the Swiss National Library
 National Mining Hall of Fame: Alexander Agassiz 
National Academy of Sciences Biographical Memoir
 Keweenaw National Historical Park Preserving many significant buildings and an archives of the Calumet and Hecla Mining Company and Alexander Agassiz.

1835 births
1910 deaths
19th-century American zoologists
20th-century American zoologists
American curators
American ichthyologists
Agassiz family
Members of the United States National Academy of Sciences
Fellows of the American Academy of Arts and Sciences
Foreign Members of the Royal Society
Honorary Fellows of the Royal Society of Edinburgh
Recipients of the Pour le Mérite (civil class)
Victoria Medal recipients
Calumet and Hecla Mining Company personnel
United States Coast Survey personnel
Harvard School of Engineering and Applied Sciences alumni
Swiss emigrants to the United States
People from Neuchâtel
People who died at sea
Members of the Göttingen Academy of Sciences and Humanities
Members of the Royal Society of Sciences in Uppsala